Acacia gonocarpa, commonly known as wuluru, is a tree or shrub belonging to the genus Acacia and the subgenus Juliflorae. It is native to northern Australia.

Description
It is many-stemmed, spindly or spreading shrub often with drooping branches and a sparse canopy. The smooth bark becomes finely fissured toward the base of the trunk. The branchlets are angled and later terete with minute ridges. The phyllodes are arranged singly or infrequently in twos or threes. It blooms from December to June producing yellow flowers. The flower spikes occur in singly or in pairs at the phyllode axils.

Taxonomy
The species was first formally described by the botanist Ferdinand von Mueller in 1859 as part of the work Contributiones ad Acaciarum Australiae Cognitionem as published in the Journal of the Proceedings of the Linnean Society, Botany. It was reclassified as Racosperma gonocarpum by Leslie Pedley in 2003 but transferred back to the genus Acacia in 2006. The only other synonym is Acacia gonocarpa var. gonocarpa.

Distribution
It is found in the Kimberley region of Western Australia and in the Northern Territory from Melville Island in the north , south to Kakadu National Park. Usually it is found among sandstone outcrops and ranges and along rocky watercourses in sandy soils in open Eucalypt or mixed woodland communities sometimes it is associated with Melaleuca nervosa.

See also
List of Acacia species

References

gonocarpa
Acacias of Western Australia
Plants described in 1859
Taxa named by Ferdinand von Mueller
Flora of the Northern Territory